Yalinga is a town and sub-prefecture in the Haute-Kotto prefecture of the central-eastern Central African Republic.

History 
Yalinga was founded as a French post by Lieutenant Bissey on 1 March 1912 to anticipate any further attacks from Kamoun.

On 28 February 2010, LRA attacked Yalinga. They pillaged police station, weather station, a safari camp and kidnapped 26 people.

On 22 April 2021 Yalinga was captured from rebels of Coalition of Patriots for Change by Russian mercenaries allied with government forces.

Transport
The town is served by Yalinga Airport.

References

External links
Satellite map at Maplandia

Sub-prefectures of the Central African Republic
Populated places established in 1912
Populated places in Haute-Kotto